Snooker world rankings 2007/2008: The official world ranking points for the 96 professional snooker players in the 2007–08 season are listed below. The total points from the seasons 2006–07 and 2007–08 were used to determine the rankings for the season 2008/2009.

Ranking points 
 
{| class="wikitable sortable" style="text-align: center;"
|-
! scope=col class=unsortable | No.
! scope=col class=unsortable |  Ch 
! scope=col width="200pt" | Player
! scope=col | Points 2006/07
! scope=col | SM
! scope=col | GP
! scope=col | NI
! scope=col | UK
! scope=col | WO
! scope=col | CO
! scope=col | WSC
! scope=col | Points 2007/08
! scope=col | Total
|-
| 1 || 4 || style="text-align:left;"| Ronnie O'Sullivan
| 20750 || 700 || 5000 || 2500 || 7500 || 4000 || 0 || 10000 || 29700 || 50450
|-
| 2 || 8 || style="text-align:left;"| Stephen Maguire
| 19550 || 1900 || 2375 || 5000 || 6000 || 700 || 5000 || |5000 || 25975 || 45525
|-
| 3 ||  || style="text-align:left;"| Shaun Murphy
| 21350 || 700 || 4000 || 3200 || 4800 || 3200 || 4000 || 3800 || 23700 || 45050
|-
| 4 || 7 || style="text-align:left;"| Mark Selby
| 18275 || 3200 || 1750 || 700 || 4800 || 5000 || 3200 || 1400 || 20050 || 38325
|-
| 5 || 4 || style="text-align:left;"| John Higgins
| 23100 || 1900 || 2375 || 700 || 1050 || 2500 || 2500 || 3800 || 14825 || 37925
|-
| 6 || 2 || style="text-align:left;"| Stephen Hendry
| 17375 || 1900 || 1750 || 1900 || 1050 || 3200 || 700 || 6400 || 16900 || 34275
|-
| 7 || 7 || style="text-align:left;"| Ali Carter
| 15750 || 700 || 2375 || 1900 || 1050 || 2500 || 1900 || 8000 || 18425 || 34175
|-
| 8 || 8 || style="text-align:left;"| Ryan Day
| 14450 || 4000 || 2375 || 1900 || 1050 || 1900 || 3200 || 5000 || 19425 || 33875
|-
| 9 || 3 || style="text-align:left;"| Peter Ebdon
| 18000 || 700 || 3125 || 2500 || 1050 || 700 || 1900 || 5000 || 14975 || 32975
|-
| 10 || 3 || style="text-align:left;"| Neil Robertson
| 20550 || 700 || 1750 || 2500 || 1050 || 1900 || 700 || 3800 || 12400 || 32950
|-
| 11 || 2 || style="text-align:left;"| Ding Junhui
| 16325 || 1900 || 719 || 1900 || 3750 || 1900 || 1900 || 3800 || 15869 || 32194
|-
| 12 || 6 || style="text-align:left;"| Joe Perry
| 12175 || 575 || 3125 || 1400 || 2850 || 2500 || 1400 || 6400 || 18250 || 30425
|-
| 13 || 11 || style="text-align:left;"| Graeme Dott
| 18675 || 3200 || 719 || 700 || 1050 || 700 || 700 || 1400 || 8469 || 27144
|-
| 14 || 13 || style="text-align:left;"| Marco Fu
| 8925 || 1400 || 6250 || 575 || 3750 || 1400 || 1900 || 2800 || 18075 || 27000
|-
| 15 || 6 || style="text-align:left;"| Mark King
| 12325 || 575 || 1750 || 1400 || 2850 || 1400 || 1900 || 3800 || 13675 || 26000
|-
| 16 || 13 || style="text-align:left;"| Mark Allen
| 10650 || 575 || 1750 || 3200 || 2850 || 1400 || 2500 || 2800 || 15075 || 25725
|-
| 17 || 3 || style="text-align:left;"| Matthew Stevens
| 14950 || 2500 || 1750 || 575 || 863 || 575 || 1400 || 2800 || 10463 || 25413
|-
| 18 || 14 || style="text-align:left;"| Ken Doherty
| 15550 || 700 || 719 || 1900 || 1050 || 1900 || 1900 || 1400 || 9569 || 25119
|-
| 19 || 3 || style="text-align:left;"| Jamie Cope
| 11875 || 1400 || 719 || 1400 || 3750 || 1400 || 1400 || 2800 || 12869 || 24744
|-
| 20 || 3 || style="text-align:left;"| Joe Swail
| 11750 || 575 || 3125 || 1400 || 2100 || 575 || 1400 || 3800 || 12975 || 24725
|-
| 21 || 2 || style="text-align:left;"| Stuart Bingham
| 9850 || 2500 || 1750 || 575 || 2850 || 1900 || 1400 || 3800 || 14775 || 24625
|-
| 22 || 10 || style="text-align:left;"| Mark Williams
| 8825 || 700 || 1750 || 700 || 3750 || 1900 || 2500 || 3800 || 15100 || 23925
|-
| 23 || 2 || style="text-align:left;"| Nigel Bond
| 10338 || 1400 || 1750 || 1400 || 2850 || 575 || 2500 || 2800 || 13275 || 23613
|-
| 24 || 13 || style="text-align:left;"| Fergal O'Brien
| 9825 || 1400 || 1438 || 4000 || 1725 || 450 || 1400 || 2300 || 12713 || 22538
|-
| 25 || 3 || style="text-align:left;"| Ian McCulloch
| 11938 || 1900 || 719 || 1900 || 2850 || 1400 || 575 || 1150 || 10494 || 22432
|-
| 26 || 13 || style="text-align:left;"| Stephen Lee
| 12650 || 2500 || 719 || 700 || 1050 || 2500 || 700 || 1400 || 9569 || 22219
|-
| 27 || 8 || style="text-align:left;"| Barry Hawkins
| 9150 || 575 || 2375 || 1900 || 2850 || 575 || 1900 || 2800 || 12975 || 22125
|-
| 28 || 2 || style="text-align:left;"| Dave Harold
| 9250 || 2500 || 719 || 575 || 2850 || 1400 || 1400 || 2800 || 12244 || 21494
|-
| 29 || 14 || style="text-align:left;"| Steve Davis
| 11850 || 1900 || 719 || 1900 || 1050 || 1900 || 700 || 1400 || 9569 || 21419
|-
| 30 || 4 || style="text-align:left;"| Michael Judge
| 10075 || 1400 || 2375 || 1150 || 675 || 1900 || 450 || 2800 || 10750 || 20825
|-
| 31 || 5 || style="text-align:left;"| Anthony Hamilton
| 11038 || 575 || 1750 || 1400 || 2100 || 575 || 575 || 2800 || 9775 || 20813
|-
| 32 || 1 || style="text-align:left;"| Dominic Dale
| 9375 || 5000 || 1750 || 1400 || 863 || 575 || 575 || 1150 || 11313 || 20688
|-
| 33 || 1 || style="text-align:left;"| Gerard Greene
| 9300 || 575 || 4000 || 2500 || 863 || 575 || 575 || 1150 || 10238 || 19538
|-
| 34 || 10 || style="text-align:left;"| Michael Holt
| 10338 || 1400 || 1750 || 575 || 2100 || 1400 || 575 || 1150 || 8950 || 19288
|-
| 35 || 1 || style="text-align:left;"| Ricky Walden
| 8750 || 1150 || 2375 || 450 || 2100 || 450 || 1400 || 2300 || 10225 || 18975
|-
| 36 || 4 || style="text-align:left;"| Adrian Gunnell
| 8825 || 1900 || 250 || 1400 || 2100 || 1150 || 450 || 2300 || 9550 || 18375
|-
| 37 || 1 || style="text-align:left;"| Alan McManus
| 10325 || 1150 || 813 || 1150 || 675 || 1400 || 450 || 2300 || 7938 || 18263
|-
| 38 || 6 || style="text-align:left;"| Andrew Higginson
| 10625 || 450 || 813 || 450 || 1725 || 1400 || 1150 || 900 || 6888 || 17513
|-
| 39 ||  || style="text-align:left;"| John Parrott
| 9625 || 1150 || 250 || 1150 || 675 || 1150 || 1150 || 2300 || 7825 || 17450
|-
| 40 || 26 || style="text-align:left;"| Liang Wenbo
| 6775 || 1150 || 1125 || 1150 || 975 || 900 || 200 ||5000 || 10500 || 17275
|-
| 41 || 10 || style="text-align:left;"| Judd Trump
| 8650 || 900 || 813 || 900 || 488 || 1400 || 900 || 2300 || 7701 || 16351
|-
| 42 || 10 || style="text-align:left;"| Marcus Campbell
| 8125 || 325 || 2375 || 325 || 1725 || 1400 || 1400 || 650 || 8200 || 16325
|-
| 43 || 2 || style="text-align:left;"| David Gilbert
| 8575 || 1150 || 1125 || 1150 || 1725 || 1150 || 450 || 900 || 7650 || 16225
|-
| 44 || 4 || style="text-align:left;"| Rory McLeod
| 8200 || 1150 || 1750 || 450 || 675 || 450 || 1150 || 2300 || 7925 || 16125
|-
| 45 || 1 || style="text-align:left;"| Jamie Burnett
| 9375 || 450 || 813 || 1150 || 1725 || 450 || 1150 || 900 || 6638 || 16013
|-
| 46 || 15 || style="text-align:left;"| Jimmy Michie
| 7575 || 325 || 1750 || 325 || 1725 || 1150 || 900 || 1800 || 7975 || 15550
|-
| 47 || 12 || style="text-align:left;"| Mike Dunn
| 7050 || 1400 || 813 || 1150 || 488 || 900 || 1400 || 2300 || 8451 || 15501
|-
| 48 || 2 || style="text-align:left;"| Tom Ford
| 7175 || 325 || 1750 || 1400 || 1725 || 900 || 900 || 650 || 7650 || 14825
|-
| 49 || 14 || style="text-align:left;"| David Gray
| 7450 || 1150 || 813 || 1400 || 1725 || 450 || 450 || 900 || 6888 || 14338
|-
| 50 || 6 || style="text-align:left;"| Barry Pinches
| 5075 || 900 || 1125 || 900 || 1725 || 325 || 1900 || 2300 || 9175 || 14250
|-
| 51 || 4 || style="text-align:left;"| Robert Milkins
| 7863 || 450 || 1125 || 450 || 1725 || 450 || 1150 || 900 || 6250 || 14113
|-
| 52 || 3 || style="text-align:left;"| David Roe
| 5738 || 1150 || 1125 || 325 || 1350 || 1400 || 1150 || 1800 || 8300 || 14038
|-
| 53 || 19 || style="text-align:left;"| Liu Song
| 5425 || 0 || 3125 || 1150 || 1350 || 650 || 900 || 1300 || 8475 || 13900
|-
| 54 || 12 || style="text-align:left;"| Andrew Norman
| 8288 || 450 || 1438 || 450 || 675 || 1150 || 450 || 900 || 5513 || 13801
|-
| 55 || 9 || style="text-align:left;"| Ian Preece
| 6950 || 325 || 1125 || 325 || 1725 || 900 || 325 || 1800 || 6525 || 13475
|-
| 56 || 15 || style="text-align:left;"| Andy Hicks
| 7363 || 450 || 1125 || 450 || 675 || 450 || 450 || 2300 || 5900 || 13263
|-
| 57 || 5 || style="text-align:left;"| Paul Davies
| 6213 || 900 || 1438 || 325 || 2100 || 325 || 1150 || 650 || 6888 || 13101
|-
| 58 || 15 || style="text-align:left;"| Mark Davis
| 6375 || 450 || 1438 || 450 || 675 || 450 || 450 || 2800 || 6713 || 13088
|-
| 59 || 14 || style="text-align:left;"| Mark Joyce
| 5400 || 900 || 1438 || 650 || 1725 || 900 || 650 || 1300 || 7563 || 12963
|-
| 60 || 11 || style="text-align:left;"| Rod Lawler
| 7800 || 900 || 250 || 1150 || 488 || 1150 || 325 || 650 || 4913 || 12713
|-
| 61 || 3 || style="text-align:left;"| Joe Delaney
| 7425 || 900 || 1438 || 325 || 488 || 1150 || 325 || 650 || 5276 || 12701
|-
| 62 || 9 || style="text-align:left;"| Stuart Pettman
| 5313 || 1900 || 1750 || 325 || 488 || 900 || 1150 || 650 || 7163 || 12476
|-
| 63 ||  || style="text-align:left;"| Martin Gould
| 5400
| 200 || 813 || 1400 || 1350 || 650 || 200 || 1800 || 6413 || 11813
|-
| 64 || 7 || style="text-align:left;"| David Morris
| 5500 || 650 || 813 || 900 || 1725 || 650 || 900 || 400 || 6038 || 11538
|-
| 65 || 5 || style="text-align:left;"| Jimmy White
| 5725 || 325 || 1125 || 325 || 488 || 900 || 325 || 2300 || 5788 || 11513
|-
| 66 || 33 || style="text-align:left;"| James Wattana
| 6538 || 450 || 813 || 1150 || 675 || 450 || 450 || 900 || 4888 || 11426
|-
| 67 || 2 || style="text-align:left;"| Tian Pengfei
| 6125 || 0 || 1438 || 200 || 300 || 1400 || 200 || 1300 || 4838 || 10963
|-
| 68 || 3 || style="text-align:left;"| Lee Spick
| 5600 || 650 || 250 || 900 || 1350 || 650 || 1150 || 400 || 5350 || 10950
|-
| 69 || 3 || style="text-align:left;"| Joe Jogia
| 5688 || 1150 || 1125 || 200 || 1350 || 200 || 650 || 400 || 5075 || 10763
|-
| 70 || 8 || style="text-align:left;"| Scott MacKenzie
| 5275 || 1400 || 250 || 325 || 488 || 325 || 325 || 2300 || 5413 || 10688
|-
| 71 ||  || style="text-align:left;"| Matthew Selt
| 5400
| 200 || 813 || 200 || 975 || 1150 || 650 || 1300 || 5288 || 10688
|-
| 72 ||  || style="text-align:left;"| Patrick Wallace
| 5400
| 650 || 1125 || 900 || 1350 || 650 || 200 || 400 || 5275 || 10675
|-
| 73 || 15 || style="text-align:left;"| Robin Hull 
| 6775 || 325 || 1125 || 900 || 488 || 450 || 200 || 400 || 378 || 10663
|-
| 74 || 6 || style="text-align:left;"| Tony Drago
| 5925 || 1400 || 1125 || 200 || 300 || 650 || 650 || 400 || 4725 || 10650
|-
| 75 || 18 || style="text-align:left;"| Drew Henry
| 5675 || 325 || 250 || 900 || 488 || 1150 || 1150 || 650 || 4913 || 10588
|-
| 76 ||  || style="text-align:left;"| Rodney Goggins
| 5400
| 200 || 813 || 650 || 1350 || 650 || 200 || 1300 || 5163 || 10563
|-
| 77 ||  || style="text-align:left;"| James McBain
| 5400
| 200 || 1125 || 200 || 975 || 200 || 650 || 1800 || 5150 || 10550
|-
| 78 ||  || style="text-align:left;"| Supoj Saenla
| 5400
| 900 || 813 || 200 || 975 || 200 || 200 || 1800 || 5088 || 10488
|-
| 79 ||  || style="text-align:left;"| Leo Fernandez
| 5400
| 650 || 250 || 200 || 300 || 650 || 900 || 1800 || 4750 || 10150
|-
| 80 ||  || style="text-align:left;"| Jamie O'Neill
| 5400
| 900 || 250 || 900 || 975 || 650 || 650 || 400 || 4725 || 10125
|-
| 81 ||  || style="text-align:left;"| Liu Chuang
| 5400
| 0 || 250 || 200 || 300 || 200 || 900 || 2800 || 4650 || 10050
|-
| 82 ||  || style="text-align:left;"| Kurt Maflin
| 5400
| 200 || 250 || 650 || 975 || 650 || 1150 || 400 || 4275 || 9675
|-
| 83 || 9 || style="text-align:left;"| Alfie Burden
| 5400 || 900 || 813 || 200 || 975 || 650 || 200 || 400 || 4138 || 9538
|-
| 84 ||  || style="text-align:left;"| Xiao Guodong
| 5400
| 0 || 1125 || 900 || 300 || 200 || 200 || 1300 || 4025 || 9425
|-
| 85 ||  || style="text-align:left;"| Lee Walker
| 5400
| 650 || 813 || 1150 || 300 || 200 || 200 || 400 || 3713 || 9113
|-
| 86 ||  || style="text-align:left;"| Munraj Pal
| 5400
| 200 || 1125 || 200 || 1350 || 200 || 200 || 400 || 3675 || 9075
|-
| 87 ||  || style="text-align:left;"| Gareth Coppack
| 5400
| 650 || 250 || 200 || 300 || 200 || 200 || 1800 || 3600 || 9000
|-
| 88 ||  || style="text-align:left;"| Alex Davies
| 5400
| 200 || 250 || 200 || 300 || 650 || 650 || 1300 || 3550 || 8950
|-
| 89 || 10 || style="text-align:left;"| Issara Kachaiwong
| 4475 || 0 || 813 || 650 || 300 || 200 || 650 || 1800 || 4413 || 8888
|-
| 90 ||  || style="text-align:left;"| Michael White
| 5400
| 0 || 250 || 650 || 300 || 200 || 650 || 1300 || 3350 || 8750
|-
| 91 ||  || style="text-align:left;"| Jimmy Robertson
| 5400
| 650 || 813 || 650 || 300 || 200 || 200 || 400 || 3213 || 8613
|-
| 92 || 17 || style="text-align:left;"| Ben Woollaston
| 4975 || 200 || 1438 || 650 || 300 || 200 || 200 || 400 || 3388 || 8363
|-
| 93 ||  || style="text-align:left;"| Fraser Patrick
| 5400
| 200 || 1125 || 200 || 300 || 200 || 200 || 400 || 2625 || 8025
|-
| 94 ||  || style="text-align:left;"| Steve Mifsud
| 5400
| 200 || 250 || 200 || 300 || 200 || 650 || 400 || 2200 || 7600
|-
| 95 ||  || style="text-align:left;"| Kevin Van Hove
| 5400
| 650 || 250 || 200 || 300 || 200 || 200 || 400 || 2200 || 7600
|-
| 96 ||  || style="text-align:left;"| Ashley Wright
| 5400
| 200 || 250 || 200 || 300 || 200 || 200 || 400 || 1750 || 7150
|}

Notes

References

2007
Ranking points 2008
Ranking points 2007